Myrbostad Church is a parish church of the Church of Norway in Hustadvika Municipality in Møre og Romsdal county, Norway. It is located on the east side of the village of Elnesvågen at the inner end of the Frænfjorden. It is one of the two churches for the Vågøy og Myrbostad parish which is part of the Molde domprosti (arch-deanery) in the Diocese of Møre. The white, wooden church was built in a long church design in 1880 using plans drawn up by the Christiania-based architect Johannes Henrik Nissen. The church seats about 400 people.

History
In the 1870s, plans were made to build a church near Elnesvågen so the people would be much closer to their church. The plan was to maintain two churches for the parish (the old Vågøy Church and the new Myrbostad Church) and that the new church would become the main church for the parish. The church was designed by Henrik Nissen. The building was constructed and consecrated in 1880. The long church has a large rectangular nave with a chancel on the east end that was flanked by two sacristies on the north and south sides. The church was renovated and enlarged in 1973, including adding a new, larger entrance.

Media gallery

See also
List of churches in Møre

References

Hustadvika (municipality)
Churches in Møre og Romsdal
Wooden churches in Norway
Long churches in Norway
19th-century Church of Norway church buildings
Churches completed in 1880
1880 establishments in Norway